The Treasury Casino, also known as The Treasury is a casino in Brisbane, Queensland, Australia. It also houses a hotel, 6 restaurants, 5 bars, and a nightclub. The casino is operated by Star Entertainment Group.

One percent of the casino's gross gaming revenue is deposited in the Jupiters Casino Community Benefit Fund. This fund supports non-profit community-based groups and is administered by the Government of Queensland.

Origins
The casino and hotel occupy two heritage-listed buildings, the Treasury Building, and the nearby Lands Administration Building. The buildings are separated by Queens Gardens. A 700-vehicle car park is located beneath the park.

Architecture and refurbishment
An early 19th century building with Edwardian-Baroque exterior designs and ornate colonnades, striking sandstone walls and six-story atrium, the historic Treasury Building houses a three-level gaming emporium of 80 gaming tables and over 1,300 gaming machines, and was opened refurbished as the Treasury Casino in April 1995. The hotel section of the Conrad Treasury Casino is housed in the former Lands Administration Building.

There are also function rooms, ranging from early 19th century decor to modern business meeting rooms.

Gaming
 

The Treasury Casino offers a number of gambling games including: Blackjack, Treasury 21 (a variant of Spanish 21), mini Baccarat (card game), Treasury Wheel (Australian Big Six wheel), Caribbean Stud Poker, Roulette, Craps, 3-Card Poker, Sic Bo, and Slot Machines. In addition, there is also a poker room offering Texas hold'em poker and Omaha cash games along with regular poker tournaments.

Queen's Wharf
As part of the Queen's Wharf development by the Star Entertainment Group and Chow Tai Fook Enterprises, a new casino will open in 2022, with the existing building to be converted into a department store.

See also

Tourism in Brisbane

References

External links

1995 establishments in Australia
Casinos completed in 1995
Hotels established in 1995
Brisbane central business district
Buildings and structures in Brisbane
Casino hotels
Casinos in Queensland
Hilton Worldwide
Hotels in Queensland
Tourist attractions in Brisbane
Star Entertainment Group